Greater Victoria (also known as the Greater Victoria Region) is located in British Columbia, Canada, on the southern tip of Vancouver Island. It is usually defined as the thirteen municipalities of the Capital Regional District (CRD) on Vancouver Island as well as some adjacent areas and nearby islands. 

The Capital Regional District administers some aspects of public administration for the whole metro region; other aspects are administered by the individual member municipalities of Greater Victoria. Roughly, Greater Victoria consists of all land and nearby islands east of a line drawn from the southern end of Finlayson Arm to the eastern shore of Sooke Harbour, along with some lands on the northern shore of Sooke Harbour.

Many places, buildings, and institutions associated with Victoria such as the University of Victoria, Victoria International Airport, and the Swartz Bay Ferry Terminal, are outside the City of Victoria itself, which has an area of just  on the southern tip of Greater Victoria. Victoria is the locality indicated in the mailing addresses of several CRD municipalities and localities adjacent to Victoria. The central city of Victoria lends its name and cultural influence to many places and organizations in the metro region.

Municipalities 
There are 13 cities, towns, and district municipalities in Greater Victoria.

"Core" municipalities
 The City of Victoria, the adjacent District Municipalities of Saanich, Esquimalt and Oak Bay, and the town of View Royal. 

West Shore
 The cities of Colwood and Langford and the District Municipalities of Highlands, Metchosin, and Sooke, which lie generally west of Esquimalt Harbour and Portage Inlet.

Saanich Peninsula
 The District Municipalities of Central Saanich, North Saanich, parts of Saanich, and the town of Sidney, which lie to the north of Victoria.

This breakdown is roughly mirrored by the three school districts in Greater Victoria.
 Greater Victoria School District #61 - (the core municipalities)
 Sooke School District #62 - (the Western Communities)
 Saanich School District #63 - (the Saanich Peninsula)

Greater Victoria is the southernmost urban area in Western Canada; it is located south of the 49th parallel.

Neighbourhoods 
This list is similar to, but not identical with, that used by the Greater Victoria real estate sales industry. Neighbourhoods with official status are italicized. Others may have no official definition, hence other lists of neighbourhoods in the Victoria area may differ. Other sources may give different boundaries as well.

Victoria
 Burnside-Gorge
 Rock Bay
 Downtown
 Chinatown
 Fairfield-Gonzales
 Cook Street Village
 Humboldt Valley
 Gonzales
 Fernwood
 Harris Green
 Hillside-Quadra
Blanshard
Quadra Village
 Mayfair
 James Bay
 Jubilee
 North Jubilee
 South Jubilee
 North Park
 Oaklands
 Rockland
 Victoria West
 Saanich
 Blenkinsop
 Cadboro Bay
 Queenswood
 Ten Mile Point
 Carey
 Glanford
 Marigold
 Cordova Bay
 Gordon Head
 Arbutus
 Mt. Douglas
 North Quadra
 Quadra
 Cedar Hill
 Lake Hill
 Maplewood
 Royal Oak
 Broadmead-Sunnymead
 Rural Saanich
 Beaver Lake
 Elk Lake
 Interurban
 Prospect Lake
 Strawberry Vale
 West Burnside
 Saanich Core
 Shelbourne
 Mt. Tolmie
 Tillicum
 The Gorge
 Oak Bay
 Gonzales (Foul Bay)
 Uplands
 Willows Beach
 Windsor Park
 South Oak Bay
 North Oak Bay
 Estevan
 Esquimalt
 Craigflower
 Colville Road
 Gorge Vale
 Parklands
 Rockheights
 Saxe Point
 Songhees
 West Bay
 Work Point (DND)
 View Royal
 Shoreline
 Colwood
 Belmont Park
 Colwood Corners
 Hatley Park
 Mill Hill
 Royal Roads
 Royal Bay
 Triangle Mountain
 Langford
 North
 Bear Mountain
 Florence Lake
 Millstream
 Thetis Heights
 South
 Glen Lake
 Goldstream Meadows
 Luxton
 Ravenwood
 Westhills
 Highlands
 Durrance Lake
 Thetis Lake
 Willis Point
 Metchosin
 Happy Valley
 Matheson Lake
 Rocky Point
 William Head
 Central Saanich
 Brentwood Bay
 Island View
 Saanichton
 North Saanich
 Cloake Hill
 Dean Park
 Deep Cove
 Lands End
 Patricia Bay ("Pat Bay")
 Swartz Bay
 Ardmore
 Sidney
 Sooke
 Broom Hill
 East Sooke
 Otter Point
 Kemp Lake
 Sooke Town Centre
 Sunriver
 Saseenos
 Whiffin Spit

Climate

Demographics

The Greater Victoria region has a combined population of 397,237 according to the 2021 Canadian census. The region comprises two of the fifteen most populous municipalities in British Columbia (Saanich, at number seven, and Victoria at number thirteen). The Canadian Census ranks Greater Victoria as the 15th largest metropolitan area in Canada, by population. The combined population of the cities, municipalities, unincorporated areas and Indian Reserves in the region are as follows:

 Saanich 117,735
 Victoria 91,867
 Langford 46,584
 Colwood 18,961
 Oak Bay 17,990
 Esquimalt 17,533
 Central Saanich 17,385
 Sooke 15,086
 Sidney 12,318
 North Saanich 12,235
 View Royal 11,575
 Juan de Fuca (Part 1) 5,132
 Metchosin 5,067
 Highlands 2,482
 New Songhees 1A Indian Reserve 1,839
 East Saanich 2 Indian Reserve 1,790
 South Saanich 1 Indian Reserve 712
 Cole Bay 3 Indian Reserve 266
 T'Sou-ke Indian Reserve 230
 Becher Bay 1 Indian Reserve 221
 Esquimalt Indian Reserve 120
 Union Bay 4 Indian Reserve 109

Ethnicity
In comparison to the Lower Mainland (Vancouver and environs), the region does not have a great deal of racial diversity. Most of the population is of European descent. A substantial community of those of Chinese descent has existed in Greater Victoria since the Fraser Gold Rush of 1858–60, which saw the first significant influx, arriving first via San Francisco then directly from China. There is also a substantial First Nations (indigenous) population whose ancestors have lived in the area for thousands of years. Numerous First Nations reserves, forming distinct communities, exist in the region — primarily on the Saanich Peninsula, in Esquimalt, and in the Western Communities — although the majority of the First Nations population live off-reserve.

The largest ethnic groups in Greater Victoria, according to the 2016 census, are:

English - 140,510
Scottish - 98,475
Canadian - 86,000
Irish - 73,170
German - 50,440
French - 38,775
Ukrainian - 19,410
Chinese - 17,825
Dutch - 17,790
First Nations - 15,430
Welsh - 14,140
Polish - 13,610
Norwegian - 12,130
Italian - 11,665
Swedish - 9,380
Indian - 9,180
Russian - 8,565
American - 8,485
Metis - 7,135
Filipino - 6,650

The same information, although grouped more geographically, is below. The largest sub-grouping is included.

Culture
Many Victoria Region municipalities have their own fairs: Oak Bay's Tea Party, Esquimalt's Buccaneer Days, Sidney's Sidney Days, Sooke's Sooke Days, Western Communities' Luxton Rodeo, and Central Saanich's Saanich Fair. The Saanich Fair is the oldest and largest of all the Greater Victoria local fair venues; it is considered a de facto regional fair because of its greater size, content, and famous reputation. The Saanich Fair has the largest number of attendees of all the Victoria area fairs.

There is a wide variety of entertainment and recreational facilities and activities. The mild coastal climate ensures less extreme weather changes. Outdoor and indoor recreational areas are abundant throughout the region. The Rifflandia Music Festival takes place downtown in mid to late September. The Victoria Tall Ships Festival showcase sailing vessels and the sailing life. The Victoria Symphony performs over 100 concerts a year, including the renowned Symphony Splash, an annual free concert in the Inner Harbour on the August Sunday preceding B.C Day. The orchestra is on a barge playing to an audience of over 40,000. The Electronic Music Festival also takes place at Centennial Square, where DJs can show off their music mixing skills.

These regional positive qualities, along with new transportation links, international high-profile events (2007 NATO meeting, 2007 FIFA U-20 World Cup, 1994 Commonwealth Games), could have helped produce a socio-economic effect in terms of: attractiveness as a place of residency, low unemployment, high real estate development potential for profit, increasing immigration of new people(s), and expanding opportunities for business or economic development. High-profile international attention performs its duty as a marketing, public relations, and sales catalyst for further activity. Boaters from around the world gather annually in the waters off of Vancouver Island for the Swiftsure International Yacht Race.

An example of this economic opportunity also lies in Victoria's geography. The April 19, 2008 Victoria Times Colonist newspaper printed a section, sponsored by the Downtown Victoria Business Association, focusing on the area's downtown selection of goods and service providers. As it was in the early days with merchants supplying and outfitting gold rush prospectors, today's modern merchants supply outdoor recreation seekers before they head to other parts of Vancouver Island for surfing, kayaking, hiking, camping, swimming, cycling or whatever activities they seek.

In June 2010, the Canadian Navy celebrated its 100th anniversary with a Fleet Review in the waters off of Greater Victoria, by Canada's former Governor General Michaëlle Jean. The review was attended by warships from Canada, France, New Zealand, Australia, Japan, the United States along with US and Canadian Coast Guard vessels. These celebration activities coincided with the Esquimalt Buccaneer Days Fair and the 2010 FIFA World Cup activities in local bars.

The 2010 Olympic Torch Relay started in Greater Victoria and proceeded to other communities across Canada. The conclusion of the torch relay began the 2010 Winter Olympics in Vancouver BC.

Notable places

Educational institutions
 Camosun College (Saanich and Oak Bay)
Lester B. Pearson College (Metchosin)
Oshio College/Royal Pacific Institute
 Pacific Rim College (Victoria)
Royal Roads University (Colwood)
University of Victoria (Saanich and Oak Bay)
University Canada West (Victoria campus closed 2011)
 Vancouver Island School of Art (Victoria)
 Victoria College of Art (Victoria)

Hospitals
Royal Jubilee Hospital (Victoria and Saanich)
Saanich Peninsula Hospital (Central Saanich/Saanich Peninsula)
Victoria General Hospital (View Royal)

Military installations
(Department of National Defence)

CFB Esquimalt HMC Dockyard (Esquimalt)
CFB Esquimalt Naden (Esquimalt)
 (Victoria)
Bay Street Armoury (Victoria)
Lieutenant General E.C. Ashton Armoury (Saanich)
Victoria International Airport Air Force Squadron detachment (North Saanich)

Parks and natural features
Beacon Hill Park (Victoria)
Clover Point (Victoria)
Dallas Road Waterfront Pathway (Victoria)
Elk/Beaver Lake Regional Park (Saanich)
Francis/King Regional Park (Saanich)
Galloping Goose Regional Trail (from Victoria west through Sooke)
ȽÁU,WELṈEW̱/John Dean Provincial Park (North Saanich and Central Saanich)
Mount Douglas Park (Saanich)
Moss Rock Park (Victoria)
Ogden Point (Victoria)
Sea to Sea Green Blue Belt
East Sooke Regional Park (Juan de Fuca EA)
Goldstream Provincial Park (Langford)
Gowlland Tod Provincial Park (Highlands, and Juan de Fuca EA)
Mount Work Regional Park (Saanich, Highlands, and Juan de Fuca EA)
Sooke Potholes Regional Park, Sooke Potholes Provincial Park and Sooke River Provincial Park (Sooke)
Swan Lake/Christmas Hill Nature Sanctuary (Saanich)
Thetis Lake Regional Park (View Royal, Langford, and Highlands)
Uplands Park (Oak Bay)
Cattle Point (Uplands Park, Oak Bay)
Saxe Point Park/Fleming Beach, former military defence gun bunkers/observation (Esquimalt)
Hartland landfill (mountain biking, tours & hiking) (Saanich) 
Mount Tolmie (Saanich)

Scientific facilities
Dominion Astrophysical Observatory/National Research Council of Canada (Saanich)
Gonzales Observatory for Atmospheric Biogeochemistry Research (Oak Bay)
Institute of Ocean Sciences/Fisheries and Oceans Canada (North Saanich)
Geological Survey of Canada, GSC Pacific/Natural Resources Canada (Sidney)
Sidney Laboratory (Centre for Plant Health)/Canadian Food Inspection Agency (North Saanich)

Sites of interest

Historical
Craigdarroch Castle (Victoria)
Craigflower Manor and Craigflower Schoolhouse (Saanich)
Empress Hotel (Victoria)
Fort Rodd Hill and Fisgard Lighthouse / Parks Canada (Colwood)
Hatley Park (Colwood)
Ross Bay Cemetery (Victoria)
Harling Point Chinese Cemetery (Oak Bay)
Veteran's Cemetery (Esquimalt)
Chinatown (Victoria)
Fleming Beach, historical defence bunkers (Esquimalt)
Emily Carr House (Victoria)
Victoria High School (Victoria)
Camosun College (Saanich)
Beacon Hill Park (Victoria)
Helmcken House (Victoria)
Victoria Police Department Station Museum (150 years of policing artifacts) (Victoria)
Butchart Gardens (Central Saanich)

Political
Government House (Victoria)
Parliament Buildings (Victoria)
Victoria City Hall (Victoria)

Cultural
Art Gallery of Greater Victoria (Victoria)
British Columbia Aviation Museum (Sidney)
CFB Esquimalt Military Museum (Esquimalt)
Chinatown (Victoria)
Maltwood Art Gallery UVic University Centre (Saanich)
Royal British Columbia Museum & IMAX National Geographic Theatre (Victoria)
Shaw Ocean Discovery Centre (Sidney)
Thunderbird Park (Victoria, British Columbia)

Sports facilities
Golf
Bear Mountain Golf and Country Club (Langford)
Cedar Hill Golf Course (Saanich)
Gorge Vale Golf Club (Esquimalt)
Olympic View Golf Club (Langford and Colwood)
Royal Colwood Golf and Country Club (Colwood)
Royal Oak Golf Club (Saanich)
Uplands Golf Club (Oak Bay)
Victoria Golf Club (Oak Bay)
Highland Pacific Golf (Saanich)
Prospect Lake Golf Course (Saanich)
Cordova Bay Golf Course (Saanich)

Other
Gordon Head Recreation Centre (Saanich)
Cedar Hill Recreation Centre (Saanich)
Victoria City Rowing Club (Saanich)
 Crystal Pool & Fitness Centre (Victoria)
George Pearkes Recreation Centre (Saanich)
Juan de Fuca Recreation Centre (Colwood)
Save-On-Foods Memorial Centre arena (Victoria)
Royal Victoria Yacht Club (Oak Bay)
Saanich Commonwealth Place (swimming pool and library-Greater Victoria Public Library) (Saanich)
Victoria Curling Club (Victoria)
Western Speedway (motor racing) (Langford)
Bear Mountain Arena (Colwood)
Royal Athletic Park (Victoria)
Centennial Stadium (track & field) (Saanich, University of Victoria)
Esquimalt Recreation Centre (Esquimalt)
Panorama Recreation Centre (North Saanich)
Oak Bay Recreation Centre (Oak Bay)
Eagle Ridge Community Centre (Langford)
City Centre Park (Langford)

Transportation and ports
Highways
Greater Victoria is served by 3 provincial highways

Highway 17
Connects Greater Victoria to Victoria International Airport and BC Ferries service to Vancouver. A four lane highway with mix of freeway, expressway and arterial standards.

Highway 1 (Trans Canada Highway)
Connects the core eastern municipalities to the western municipalities as a 12km freeway with 7 interchanges.

Highway 14
Connects Greater Victoria to Sooke, mostly a two lane highway.

Ports
Black Ball Ferries (to Port Angeles, Washington) (Victoria)
Esquimalt and Nanaimo Railway terminus (Victoria)
Victoria Harbour (Victoria)
 Victoria Inner Harbour Airport
Swartz Bay Ferry Terminal (BC Ferries to Tsawwassen, near Vancouver) (North Saanich)
Victoria International Airport (North Saanich)
 Victoria Airport Water Aerodrome
Washington State Ferries (Sidney, to the San Juan Islands and Anacortes)
Downtown Victoria, Helijet helicopter service to Downtown Vancouver, (Victoria)

Media outlets

Print
Victoria News, local media
Saanich News, local media
Goldstream News Gazette, local media
Peninsula News Review, local media
Sooke News Mirror, local media
Oak Bay News, local media
Times Colonist, regional newspaper
Monday Magazine, entertainment weekly publication
The Nexus, Camosun College student newspaper
The Martlet, University of Victoria student newspaper
Black Press community newspapers
LookOut, newspaper of CFB Esquimalt Navy Base
Victoria Marketplace, monthly business profiles
Douglas Magazine, Victoria based business magazine

Social Media Communities

Victoria Buzz
Victoria News, local media
Saanich News, local media
Goldstream News Gazette, local media
Peninsula News Review, local media
Sooke News Mirror, local media
Oak Bay News, local media

AM Radio
CKMO 900 kHz
CFAX 1070 kHz

FM Radio
CBUX, Espace musique - 88.9
CBCV, CBC Radio One - 90.5 MHz
CJZN 91.3 MHz - "The Zone @ 91-3"
CBU, CBC Radio 2 - 92.1 MHz
CIOC 98.5 MHz - "The Ocean"
CKKQ 100.3 MHz - "100.3 The Q!"
CFUV 101.9 MHz - CFUV, University of Victoria
CHTT 103.1 MHz - "Kiss FM"
CHBE 107.3 MHz - "Virgin Radio"
CILS 107.9 MHz - "Francophonics"

Television
Channel 6: CHEK (Independent)
Cable 4: SHAW (Shaw TV)
Channel 53, Cable 12: CIVI (CTV 2)

Regional organisations
AVI Health and Community Services (AVI)
Greater Victoria Chamber of Commerce
Greater Victoria Film Commission
Greater Victoria Art Gallery
Greater Victoria Cycling Coalition
Greater Victoria Public Library
Island Sexual Health
Peers Victoria Resources Society
University of Victoria Students' Society (UVSS)
Victoria Pride Society

See also 

 Fort Victoria

References 

 
Southern Vancouver Island
Capital Regional District
Victoria
Populated coastal places in Canada